Charlotte Johanna of Waldeck-Wildungen (13 December 1664 in Arolsen – 1 February 1699 in Hildburghausen) was a daughter of Count Josias II of Waldeck-Wildungen and his wife, Wilhelmine Christine, a daughter of William of Nassau-Siegen.

Marriage and issue 
She married on 2 December 1690 in Maastricht to John Ernest IV, Duke of Saxe-Coburg-Saalfeld, the son of Ernst I, Duke of Saxe-Coburg-Altenburg.  She was his second wife.  She had eight children:

 William Frederick (16 August 1691 in Arolsen – 28 July 1720 in Saalfeld)
 Charles Ernest (12 September 1692 in Saalfeld – 30 December 1720 in Cremona)
 Sophia Wilhelmina (9 August 1693 in Saalefld – 4 December 1727 in Rudolstadt), married on 8 February 1720 to Frederick Anton, Prince of Schwarzburg-Rudolstadt
 Henriette Albertine (8 July 1694 in Saalfeld – 1 April 1695 in Saalfeld)
 Louise Emilie (24 August 1695 in Saalfeld – 21 August 1713 in Coburg)
 Charlotte (30 October 1696 in Saalfeld – 2 November 1696 in Saalfeld)
 Francis Josias, Duke of Saxe-Coburg-Saalfeld (25 September 1697 in Saalefeld – 16 September 1764 in Rodach)
 Henriette Albertine (20 November 1698 in Saalfeld – 5 February 1728 in Coburg)

She died in 1699 at the home of her brother-in-law Ernest, Duke of Saxe-Hildburghausen.

References 

House of Waldeck
1664 births
1699 deaths
German countesses
17th-century German people
Duchesses of Saxe-Coburg-Saalfeld